"Chapter 9" is the ninth episode of the sixth season of the anthology television series American Horror Story. It aired on November 9, 2016, on the cable network FX. The episode was written by Tim Minear and directed by Alexis O. Korycinski.

Plot
Lee and Audrey convince Dylan that the macabre series of hauntings in the set are real and that they must retrieve the video and rescue Monet. After arriving at the Polk compound, Lee separates from the group to erase her video confession from one of the videotapes as Dylan finds the Polks' pickup truck, while Audrey finds Monet and the tapes. The women are confronted by Ishmael Polk and Audrey shoots him in the head with Lee's revolver. Lot Polk escapes with the truck as Audrey and Monet escape into the woods, leaving Dylan behind. The actresses return to the house, and they're shocked and infuriated when they watched the video of Lee confessing to Mason's murder.

Meanwhile, three teenage fans of My Roanoke Nightmare return to the woods to expose the Roanoke hauntings to the police. They run into Lee, who has fallen under Scathach's trance and murdered Todd. The possessed Lee arrives at the house to attack the other survivors, killing Monet by a broken wood shaft of a fallen chandelier. Audrey fights Lee and runs out of the house, but the latter injures the actress and traps her in the storm cellar. The ghostly colony arrives outside the house and disembowels Dylan, while Sophie and Milo are captured when they attempt to escape as the ghosts impaled the two at the stakes and burned them alive.

The next day, the police arrive at the aftermath of the carnage to rescue the survivors. They revive an unconscious Lee, who was released from the ghost's possession with no memories of the incidents. But an enraged Audrey shows up, who grabs the officer's gun and attempts to kill Lee. The officers open fire, shooting Audrey dead and leaving Lee as the sole survivor of the Blood Moon.

Reception
"Chapter 9" was watched by 2.43 million people in its original American broadcast, and gained a 1.3 ratings share among adults aged 18–49.

The episode received generally positive reviews. On the review aggregator website Rotten Tomatoes, the episode holds a 92% approval rating, based on 12 reviews with an average score of 6.2/10. The critical consensus reads, ""Chapter 9" gruesomely dismisses more characters while presenting the welcome return of another American Horror Story veteran and preparing viewers for a twisty finale." Emily L. Stephens of The A.V. Club wrote, ""Chapter 9" is a solid episode of American Horror Story most meaningful and consistent season – and by 'solid,' I mean strongly told, startling, and filled with slithering entrails and smoking corpses." In contrast, IGN's Matt Fowler stated, "The penultimate episode of American Horror Story: Roanoke was a bumpy, blurry mess of found footage and flat fiendishness."

References

External links

 

American Horror Story: Roanoke episodes
Television episodes written by Tim Minear